Pierfrancesco Cittadini (1616–1681) was an Italian painter of the Baroque period, active mainly in Bologna and noted for his portraits and lush still lifes.

Biography

Initially a pupil of Daniele Crespi, Cittadini moved to Bologna before the age of 20 to study with Guido Reni, whose influence is clearly evident in such early works as the Stoning of Saint Stephen, the Flagellation and the Crowning with Thorns in the church of Santo Stefano, Bologna. He travelled to Rome in the mid-1640s and came into contact with the French and Flemish artists living there. This international melting pot gave rise to an original artistic vocabulary aimed at the naturalistic depiction of reality in a vast number of still lifes, landscapes and portraits. He also painted decorative frescoes for the Ducal Palace of Sassuolo.

Notes

References
 Domenico Sedini, Pier Francesco Cittadini, online catalogue Artgate by Fondazione Cariplo, 2010, CC BY-SA (source for biography)

External links

Musee-Fesch site (archived 6 July 2017)

1616 births
1681 deaths
17th-century Italian painters
Italian male painters
Italian Baroque painters
Italian still life painters